The enzyme dodecanoyl-[acyl-carrier-protein] hydrolase (EC 3.1.2.21) catalyzes the reaction

a dodecanoyl-[acyl-carrier-protein] + H2O  an [acyl-carrier-protein] + dodecanoate

This enzyme belongs to the family of hydrolases, specifically those acting on thioester bonds.  The systematic name is dodecanoyl-[acyl-carrier-protein] hydrolase. Other names in common use include lauryl-acyl-carrier-protein hydrolase, dodecanoyl-acyl-carrier-protein hydrolase, dodecyl-acyl-carrier protein hydrolase, and dodecanoyl-[acyl-carrier protein] hydrolase.

References

 
 

EC 3.1.2
Enzymes of unknown structure